Feliciano Panganiban Leviste (June 9, 1897–March 29, 1976), popularly known as "Sanoy", was governor of Batangas province in the Philippines from 1948 to 1971. Respected for his populist platform, Leviste governed Batangas during an unprecedented twenty four years, winning six elections in the process. He was a member of the Nacionalista party.

Footnote 5 on page 135 in Richard Neely's How Courts Govern America recounts the author's brief experience living in the Governor's palace.  He specifically recalls Leviste's policy of allowing underprivileged Batangueños to simply walk into the palace and have a free meal, typifying Leviste's populist platform.

Family life
He was married to Aurelia Malvar Leviste, daughter of Philippine revolutionary general Miguel Malvar. He was the father of Expedito Leviste, a representative from Batangas, and Rodolfo Leviste.

References

External links

Batangas Hall of Fame at Batangan
Governor Mandanas recognizing 12 June 1998 as the centennial celebration of the life and legacy of Sanoy (Tagalog)
Citation in Delegations to the General Assembly of the United Nations 
Citation in Yearbook of the United Nations
Footnote 5 on page 135 in Richard Neely's How Courts Govern America recounting Sanoy's  generosity to the needy people of Batangas 

1897 births
1976 deaths
Governors of Batangas
Nacionalista Party politicians
People from Batangas